Emma Haché is a Canadian writer of Acadian descent.

She was born in Lamèque, New Brunswick on November 25, 1979, and studied theatre at the Université de Moncton. Her first play Lave tes mains (2002) received the Prix littéraire Antonine-Maillet-Acadie Vie (youth category). She received the Prix Gratien-Gélinas in 2003 for L'intimité, which was also awarded the Governor General's Award for French-language drama. Her play Trafiquée was a finalist for a Governor General's Award in 2010 and received the Prix littéraire Antonine-Maillet-Acadie-Vie.

References 

Living people
Canadian dramatists and playwrights in French
Governor General's Award-winning dramatists
Acadian people
1979 births
Canadian women dramatists and playwrights
21st-century Canadian dramatists and playwrights
21st-century Canadian women writers
People from Gloucester County, New Brunswick
Writers from New Brunswick
Université de Moncton alumni